Vincent Leon Alexander (born March 11, 1964 in St. Tammany, Louisiana) is a former professional American football running back in the National Football League. He would play with the New Orleans Saints in 1987.  He played college football for the University of Southern Mississippi from 1983 to 1986.  As a freshman, he gained 153 rushing yards in his first start.  He also returned the opening kickoff 96 yards for a touchdown against the Alabama Crimson Tide in November 1983.  He gained 551 rushing yards in 1983, 572 in 1984, 847 yards in 1985, and 668 yards in 1986.  He was the leading rusher for Southern Mississippi for three consecutive years from 1984 to 1986.

References

External links
Pro-Football reference

1964 births
Living people
People from St. Tammany Parish, Louisiana
New Orleans Saints players
Southern Miss Golden Eagles football players
Players of American football from Louisiana